Robert Wintgen (June 13, 1882 ) was a German chemist. Wintgen studied at the University of Bonn and made his Ph.D with E. Rimbach at the University of Berlin.

After a post-doc position with Alfred Stock in Berlin between 1917 and 1919 he worked at the University of Göttingen together with Richard Adolf Zsigmondy. Influenced by this cooperation worked on colloids chemistry from that point on. Wintgen became professor at the newly founded University of Cologne in 1924 where he stayed until his retirement in 1950.

References

1882 births
20th-century German chemists
People from Solingen
University of Bonn alumni
Humboldt University of Berlin alumni
Academic staff of the Humboldt University of Berlin
Academic staff of the University of Göttingen
Academic staff of the University of Cologne
Year of death missing